Stiven Puci (born 3 May 1998) is an Albanian professional footballer who plays as a defender for Albanian club Luftëtari Gjirokastër.

Career statistics

References

External links
Stiven Puci at FSHF

1998 births
Living people
People from Gjirokastër County
Footballers from Gjirokastër
Albanian footballers
Association football defenders
Luftëtari Gjirokastër players
FK Dinamo Tirana players
Kategoria e Parë players
Kategoria Superiore players